Neonerita dorsipuncta is a moth of the family Erebidae. It was described by George Hampson in 1901. It is found in French Guiana, Brazil, Venezuela, Bolivia and Mexico.

References

 

Phaegopterina
Moths described in 1901